DISH is a town in Denton County, Texas, United States.  The town had a population of 201 at the 2010 census. This community, established in June 2000, was originally named Clark. In November 2005, the community accepted an offer to rename itself "DISH" (all capital letters) as part of a commercial agreement with satellite television company Dish Network.

History
The settlement was originally named for its founder, Landis Clark, who incorporated the town in June 2000 and served as its first mayor.  In exchange for renaming the town to DISH, all residents received free basic television service for ten years and a free digital video recorder from Dish Network. There was no formal opposition to renaming Clark; twelve citizens attended the council meeting to support the measure.

Air quality

In 2005, energy companies began drilling natural gas wells at DISH.  Town residents complained of foul smells, and of health issues they linked to the gas (natural gas, methane, and benzene) emissions from the wells.  The town spent $15,000 on an air quality test, which found elevated levels of several chemicals including benzene.  Following that, the energy companies made changes.

In response to concerns about the town's air quality, the Texas Department of State Health Services conducted air quality tests, and in May 2010, released its results for DISH, including tests of blood and urine samples from 28 DISH residents that were tested for volatile organic compounds (VOCs). The agency concluded that:
The information obtained from this investigation did not indicate that community-wide exposures from gas wells or compressor stations were occurring in the sample population. This conclusion was based on the pattern of VOC values found in the samples. Other sources of exposure such as cigarette smoking, the presence of disinfectant by-products in drinking water, and consumer or occupational/hobby related products could explain many of the findings.

The state installed an air quality monitoring station at DISH, which showed that, as of 2012, air pollutants were generally within government limits.

An article about the air quality in DISH by NPR in 2012 stated that "better studies are needed" to test for the health effects of drilling emissions, and also that the installation of gas wells in populated places "is way out ahead of public health evaluations of any kind to date".

Demographics

The population in 2010 was 201, and the estimated population for 2015 was 387.  The population of DISH was 437 at the 2020 United States Census.

Education
DISH is zoned to the Ponder Independent School District. Ponder High School is its comprehensive high school.

In popular culture
In the January 10, 2006, episode of Comedy Central's The Daily Show, correspondent Ed Helms produced a segment about DISH.

Household Name, a podcast by Business Insider, produced an episode on DISH, "A Town Called DISH", that aired on June 12, 2019.

References

The Daily Show with Jon Stewart (January 10, 2006) "Helms - Ready, Willing and Cable"
Jasinski, Laurie E. (September 1, 2006) "Clark, Texas."
Lozano, Bert (November 16, 2005) "Denton County town bids for free TV."
Moore, Dave (November 16, 2005) "Town changes its name; firm to serve up free TV."
(November 16, 2005) "Rename Your Town 'DISH,' Get Free Satellite TV for 10 Years; DISH Network Offer Equates to Possibly Millions of Dollars of Free Programming."
(December 3, 2005) "What's in a name?" WORLD Magazine.
"The Daily Show" January 10, 2006

External links
Town of DISH official website

Towns in Denton County, Texas
Dallas–Fort Worth metroplex
Towns in Texas
Dish Network
2000 establishments in Texas
Populated places established in 2000